Ken Belford (1946–2020) was a Canadian poet.

Belford was born in DeBolt, Alberta, and grew up in East Vancouver. As a young man, he worked on the log booms of the BC lower mainland, and as a lumber piler in the sawmill camps of the interior. In the 1960s he moved to Hazelton, BC, in traditional Gitxsan territory. For 35 years, as one of the first eco-tourism guides in the province, he guided world travelers in the pristine Damdochax Valley in the vicinity of the headwaters of the Nass River.

Later, Belford moved to Prince George, BC, where he lived with his partner, the artist, educator, and activist poet, Si Transken.

Belford was active in Canadian poetry from the 1960s.

Belford died on February 19, 2020.

Publications
 Fireweed, Vancouver. BC. Talonbooks, 1967
 The Post Electric Caveman, Very Stone House, 1970
 Pathways into the Mountains, Caitlin, 2000. 
 Ecologue, Harbour, Madeira Park, BC, 2005. 
 When Snakes Awaken, Nomados, Vancouver, 2006
 Lan(d)guage, Half Moon Bay, Caitlin, 2008. 
 Decompositions, Vancouver, BC. Talonbooks, 2010. 
 Internodes, Talonbooks, Vancouver, BC, 2013. 
 ''Slick Reckoning", Talonbooks, Vancouver, BC, 2016.

References

External links
 Author Bios, from Caitlin Press Inc.
 Profile from Harbour publishing
 Talon Books, aka Very Stone House

20th-century Canadian poets
20th-century Canadian male writers
Canadian male poets
21st-century Canadian poets
1946 births
People from Prince George, British Columbia
2020 deaths
21st-century Canadian male writers